Sydnee may refer to:
 Sydnee McElroy, American physician and podcast host
 Sydnee Michaels (born 1988), American professional golfer
 Sydnee Steele (born 1968), American author and sex therapist
 Sydnee Washington, American comedian, actress, model, and podcaster